Pierre Georges Corneille Vandame (17 June 1913 - 6 March 1993) was a French field hockey player who competed in the 1948 Summer Olympics.

References

External links
 

1913 births
1993 deaths
French male field hockey players
Olympic field hockey players of France
Field hockey players at the 1948 Summer Olympics